Ugram is a 2023 Indian Telugu-language action thriller film written and directed by Vijay Kanakamedala. The movie stars Allari Naresh and Mirnaa Menon in the main lead roles. Some popular actors are playing important roles in the movie, where almost the same technical team that worked for Naandhi is part of Ugram as well. Toom Venkat has written the story, whereas Abburi Ravi has penned the dialogues. Siddarth Jadhav is taking care of the cinematography, while Sricharan Pakala provides the music. Chota K. Prasad will edit the movie, wherein Brahma Kadali is the production designer
. The movie is produced by Sahu Garapati and Harish Peddi under the Shine Screens banner.

Plot 
A bona fide policeman Allari Naresh. The story goes that his family was attacked for his dedication and how he rescues his family and punishes criminals.

Cast

Crew 
Music Director : Sricharan Pakala
Editor: Chota K Prasad
DOP: Siddarth Jadhav
Production Designer: Brahma Kadali
Story: Toom Venkat
Dialogues: Abburi Ravi 
Costume Designer: Kilari Lakshmi Sree 
Publicity Designer: Sudhir 
Digital promotions: Whackedout Media 
Digital PR: Vishnu Tej Putta
PRO: Vamsi Shekar
Promos: Ravi
DI: Annapurna Studios
Colourist: Vishnu Vardhan
Marketing: First Show

References

External links 

 

2023 films
2020s Telugu-language films
2023 action thriller films
Indian action thriller films
Films shot in Andhra Pradesh
Films set in Andhra Pradesh
Films shot in Hyderabad, India